In mathematics, a quasi-analytic class of functions is a generalization of the class of real analytic functions based upon the following fact: If f is an analytic function on an interval [a,b] ⊂ R, and at some point f and all of its derivatives are zero, then f is identically zero on all of [a,b]. Quasi-analytic classes are broader classes of functions for which this statement still holds true.

Definitions

Let  be a sequence of positive real numbers. Then the Denjoy-Carleman class of functions CM([a,b]) is defined to be those f ∈ C∞([a,b]) which satisfy

for all x ∈ [a,b], some constant A, and all non-negative integers k. If Mk = 1 this is exactly the class of real analytic functions on [a,b]. 

The class CM([a,b]) is said to be quasi-analytic if whenever f ∈ CM([a,b]) and

for some point x ∈ [a,b] and all k, then f is identically equal to zero.

A function f is called a quasi-analytic function if f is in some quasi-analytic class.

Quasi-analytic functions of several variables 

For a function  and multi-indexes , denote , and 

and 

Then  is called quasi-analytic on the open set  if for every compact  there is a constant  such that 

for all multi-indexes  and all points .

The Denjoy-Carleman class of functions of  variables with respect to the sequence  on the set  can be denoted , although other notations abound. 

The Denjoy-Carleman class  is said to be quasi-analytic when the only function in it having all its partial derivatives equal to zero at a point is the function identically equal to zero.

A function of several variables is said to be quasi-analytic when it belongs to a quasi-analytic Denjoy-Carleman class.

Quasi-analytic classes with respect to logarithmically convex sequences 

In the definitions above it is possible to assume that  and that the sequence  is non-decreasing. 

The sequence  is said to be logarithmically convex, if 
 is increasing.

When  is logarithmically convex, then  is increasing and 
 for all .

The quasi-analytic class  with respect to a logarithmically convex sequence  satisfies:

  is a ring. In particular it is closed under multiplication.
  is closed under composition.

The Denjoy–Carleman theorem

The Denjoy–Carleman theorem, proved by  after  gave some partial results,  gives criteria on the sequence M under which CM([a,b]) is a quasi-analytic class. It states that the following conditions are equivalent: 
CM([a,b]) is quasi-analytic.
 where .
,  where Mj* is the largest log convex sequence bounded above by Mj.

The proof that the last two conditions are equivalent to the second uses Carleman's inequality.

Example:  pointed out that if Mn is given by one of the sequences

then the corresponding class is quasi-analytic. The first sequence gives analytic functions.

Additional properties 

For a logarithmically convex sequence  the following properties of the corresponding class of functions hold:

  contains the analytic functions, and it is equal to it if and only if 
  is stable under differentiation if and only if .

Weierstrass division 

While the ring of analytic functions and the ring of formal power series both satisfy the Weierstrass division property, the same is not true for other quasi-analytic classes.

References

Smooth functions